The Kokomo Formation is a geologic formation in Indiana. It preserves fossils dating back to the Silurian period, most notably sea scorpions.

List of Known Taxa

Eurypterids 
 Carcinosoma newlini
 Kokomopterus longicaudatus
 Erieopterus limuloides
 Erieopterus ranilarva
 Onychopterella kokomensis
 Leperditia ohioensis

Brachiopods 
 Lingula sp.
 Pentamerus divergens
 Schuchertella interstriata

Cnidarians 

 Halysites

See also

 List of fossiliferous stratigraphic units in Indiana

References

Sources
 

Silurian Indiana
Silurian southern paleotemperate deposits